Sathyapal T.A (born 1956 at Thrippunithura in Ernakulam District of Kerala) is an Indian painter and writer from Kerala.  As an artist he lived with tribes in Bastar, Ektal, Gadabengal, Amarkhnadak, Barsur, Mardum, Bindha, Karampur, Chilkutty, Sarguja, Kondagon, Anjar, Keralapal, Narayanpur, Mahasamud, Khoraput Chitrakoot and Kabir Chabutra. He is recipient of several honours including the Kerala Lalithakala Akademi Award. He is the former secretary & chairman of the Kerala Lalithakala Akademi.

Books on art
2011 - Native Art of India

Awards and honours 
 2005 Kerala Lalithakala Akademi Award.
 2011 Alvas Varna Virasath Award.

References 

Kerala Lalithkala Academy to Hold a Painting Exhibition of Artist Somnath Hore
Sathyapal TA - Art
Kerala Lalithakala Akademi’s chairman hosts his first solo showcase in 12 years
FOREST LIFE and lore
A ‘native’ space for tribal art
An uncommon palette
Portrait-perfect
Book Of Stones | Outlook India Magazine
Art of an artisan
New Lalithakala akademi chief takes over | Thiruvananthapuram News - Times of India

1956 births
Living people
Painters from Kerala
People from Ernakulam district
20th-century Indian painters
Indian male painters
20th-century Indian male artists